Ranastongi or Ranastøngji is a mountain on the border of Vang Municipality in Innlandet county and Hemsedal Municipality in Viken county, Norway. The mountain is surrounded by several other notable mountains including Rankonosi and Klanten to the north, Storebotteggi to the northwest, Veslebotnskarvet to the southeast, and Blåkampen to the east.

See also
List of mountains of Norway by height

References

Vang, Innlandet
Hemsedal
Mountains of Innlandet
Mountains of Viken